William Telfer is a retired amateur Scottish football outside right who made one appearance in the Scottish League for Queen's Park. He captained Scotland at amateur level.

References 

Scottish footballers
Scottish Football League players
Queen's Park F.C. players
Association football outside forwards
Scotland amateur international footballers
Place of birth missing
Year of birth missing